The Judges of the Supreme Court of Norfolk IslandSupreme Court of Norfolk Island are generally appointed from among Justices of the Federal Court who may sit on the Australian mainland or they may convene the court on Norfolk Island depending on the type of matter they may be dealing with.

Supreme Court sittings are generally conducted on a circuit court basis with Judges attending on Norfolk Island where the volume of work may be sufficient to justify the travel or where a regular court sitting has not been convened for some time or where the law governing a particular matter may require that the court be convened on Norfolk Island and not elsewhere (e.g. most criminal law matters except sexual offences which may now be tried off-island).

The Court staff are generally resident on Norfolk Island.

List of Judges (including Chief Justices)

References

Supreme Court of Norfolk Island